A blanket party (also known as "locksocking") is a form of corporal punishment, hazing or retaliation conducted within a peer group, most frequently within the military or military academies. The victim (usually asleep in bed) is restrained by having a blanket flung over him and held down, while other members of the group strike the victim repeatedly with improvised flails, most often a sock or bath towel containing something solid, such as a bar of soap or a padlock.

In 2015, a United States Army veteran was diagnosed with PTSD (post-traumatic stress disorder) after being the victim of a blanket party during basic training in the late 1970s.

Full Metal Jacket 
The term "blanket party" was popularized by the Stanley Kubrick film Full Metal Jacket. In the film, members of a basic training platoon give a blanket party to Private Pyle, an inept member of their platoon, whose mistakes have led to group punishment given repeatedly to the entire platoon.

See also
 List of hazing deaths in the United States
 Running the gauntlet

References 

Corporal punishments